Berlins Most Wanted is an album by German rap group Berlins Most Wanted, consisting of Bushido, Fler and Kay One. It released as Standard and Limited Deluxe Edition on 22 October 2010, by ersguterjunge.

Musical context 
The album contains a lot of typical gangsta rap and battle rap tracks ("Die ganze Galaxie" and "Lauf, Nutte, lauf!") but it also had some deeper songs ("Mein Ein und Alles",and "Wunschkonzert").

The Limited Deluxe Edition features three solo tracks of each rapper and the music video for the single "Berlins Most Wanted" and a DVD. The album doesn't have any guest appearances.

Track listing

Charts

References 

2010 albums
Bushido (rapper) albums
Fler albums
Collaborative albums
German-language albums